Cacochroa is a moth genus of the superfamily Gelechioidea.

Taxonomy
The systematic placement is problematic due to insufficient research. Formerly, it was often placed in tribe Orophiini of subfamily Oecophorinae, in particular in older treatments it is variously placed in a distinct tribe Cacochroini and/or assigned to subfamily Depressariinae (treated as a subfamily of the Elachistidae). It is now placed in the independent family Depressariidae of Gelechioidea.

Species
Cacochroa corfuella Lvovsky, 2000
Cacochroa permixtella (Herrich-Schaffer, 1854)

References

Cryptolechiinae
Moth genera